Trevor Hoyte may refer to:
 Trevor Hoyte (athlete)
 Trevor Hoyte (Canadian football)